Julien Lootens (2 August 1876 – 5 August 1942) was an early twentieth century Belgian cyclist who participated in the 1903 Tour de France and finished seventh. He was a professional cyclist between 1901 and 1921.

Palmarès 

1903
2nd Belgian National Road Race Championships
7th Tour de France
18th Stage 1, Tour de France, Lyon
15th Stage 2, Tour de France, Marseille
3rd Stage 3, Tour de France, Toulouse
2nd Stage 4, Tour de France, Bordeaux
12th Stage 5, Tour de France, Nantes
3rd Stage 6, Tour de France, Paris

1904
10th Paris - Roubaix

1905
20th Tour de France

1906
3rd Belgian National Track Championships, Sprint, Elite

References 

1876 births
1942 deaths
Belgian male cyclists
People from Wevelgem
Cyclists from West Flanders